Kerry David Miles Lloyd (September 29, 1941 – August 27, 1988) was a game designer who worked primarily on role-playing games.

Career
Kerry Lloyd got his first book, a "generic fantasy" adventure called The Mines of Keridav (1979), published through Maryland game company Phoenix Games. Phoenix Games disappeared before the sequel The Demon Pits of Caeldo, could be published, and so Lloyd decided to start his own gaming company, Gamelords, with three friends - Richard Meyer, Janet Trautvetter, and Michael Watkins. Gamelords was centered in Gaithersburg, Maryland. Lloyd co-designed the role-playing game Thieves' Guild with Richard Meyer and Michael Watkins, which was published in 1980 by Gamelords. In 1983, Gamelords reprinted The Mines of Keridav and finally published The Demon Pits of Caeldo as well.

Kerry Lloyd died on August 27, 1988.

References

External links
 Kerry Lloyd :: Pen & Paper RPG Database archive
 

1941 births
1988 deaths
Role-playing game designers